Cryptophlebia omphala is a species of moth of the family Tortricidae. It is found in New Caledonia. The habitat consists of rainforests and planted forests.

The wingspan is about 23 mm. The ground colour of the forewings is pale cream brown, dotted with brown and with brown markings. The hindwings are brown.

Etymology
The species name refers to the median position of the solitary spine on the neck of the valve and is derived from Greek omphalus (meaning median point).

References

Moths described in 2013
Grapholitini